Motoyasu (written: 元康 or 元保) is a masculine Japanese given name. Notable people with the name include:

 (died 1567), Japanese samurai
 (1978–2019), Japanese sumo wrestler

Japanese masculine given names